The NBC Opera Theatre (sometimes mistakenly spelled NBC Opera Theater and sometimes referred to as the NBC Opera Company) was an American opera company operated by the National Broadcasting Company from 1949 to 1964. The company was established specifically for the purpose of televising both established and new operas for television in English. Additionally, the company also gave live theatrical presentations of operas, sponsoring several touring productions in the United States and mounting works on Broadway.

Conductor Peter Herman Adler served as the NBCOT's music and artistic director, and Samuel Chotzinoff as the company's producer. Conductor Herbert Grossman was an associate conductor with the company when it was founded, but was later promoted to conductor in 1956. From that point on Adler and Grossman shared the conducting load while Adler remained Music Director. NBC disbanded the NBC Opera Theatre in 1964 and liquidated its assets. The company performed a total of 43 operas for NBC, the majority of which were broadcast on the program NBC Television Opera Theatre. The organization's work garnered 3 Primetime Emmy Award nominations. All of the performances were broadcast live from an NBC studio and were not pre-recorded or edited before airing, although kinescopes and later videotapes were made of live broadcasts for delayed broadcast purposes in some areas.

During its 14-year history, the NBC Opera Theatre commissioned several composers to write operas specifically for television. The most famous and most successful of these works was the very first new opera staged by the company, Gian Carlo Menotti's Amahl and the Night Visitors, which premiered live on December 24, 1951 as the first installment of the Hallmark Hall of Fame program. It was the first opera specifically composed for television in America. Other operas commissioned by the company included Bohuslav Martinů's The Marriage (1953), Lukas Foss' Griffelkin (1955), Norman Dello Joio's The Trial at Rouen (1956), Leonard Kastle's The Swing, Stanley Hollingsworth's La Grande Bretèche (1957), Menotti's Maria Golovin (1958), Philip Bezanson's Golden Child (1960), Kastle's Deseret (1961) and Menotti's Labyrinth (1963).

Most NBC Opera telecasts were sponsored by Texaco, who was also the longtime sponsor of radio broadcasts of the Metropolitan Opera. Nearly all NBCOT presentations after the middle 1950s were broadcast in color.

Notable performers

David Aiken
John Alexander
Chet Allen
Mildred Allen
David Atkinson
Frances Bible
Adelaide Bishop
Shannon Bolin
Richard Cassilly
William Chapman
Richard Cross
Phyllis Curtin
Shirlee Emmons
Igor Gorin
Donald Gramm
Melissa Hayden
Laurel Hurley
Norman Kelley
Ruth Kobart
Rosemary Kuhlmann
Gloria Lane
Mario Lanza
Brenda Lewis
Leon Lishner
Mary Mackenzie
Elaine Malbin
Nicholas Magallanes
John McCollum
Andrew McKinley
Mac Morgan
Patricia Neway
Anne Pitoniak
Michael Pollock
Frank Porretta
Leontyne Price
Charlotte Rae
Judith Raskin
John Reardon
Emile Renan
Robert Rounseville
Cesare Siepi
Glen Tetley
Michael Trimble
Paul Ukena
Theodor Uppman
Dorothy Warenskjold
 Chester Watson
Robert White
Dolores Wilson
Beverly Wolff
Kurt Yaghjian
Frances Yeend

References

External links

List of NBC Opera productions with cast info

Musical groups established in 1949
Musical groups disestablished in 1964
American opera companies
National Broadcasting Company
1949 establishments in New York City